Kakarbhitta (often written and pronounced Kakadbhitta or Kakarvitta) is a neighbourhood in Mechinagar Municipality in Jhapa District of Province No. 1, southeastern Nepal.

Demographics
At the time of the 1991 Nepal census, Mechinagar had a population of 21,366 people living in 4147 individual households.

Transport
Kakarbhitta is the eastern terminus of Nepal's east-west Mahendra Highway. at the country's eastern border with Darjeeling District, West Bengal state, India. The Panitanki neighborhood of Batasi is on the other side. There is a border checkpoint for customs and third country nationals.  Indian and Nepalese nationals cross without restriction.

Traffic between Nepal, India and Bangladesh goes through Kakarbhitta.

Kakarbhitta is 21 kilometers from Bhadrapur airport (Nepal), 105 kilometers from Biratnagar airport (Nepal) and 21.5 kilometers from Bagdogra airport (India).

References

Populated places in Jhapa District
Transit and customs posts along the India–Nepal border
Points for exit and entry of nationals from third countries along the India–Nepal border